Nathaniel Godolphin Burslem VC (2 February 1837 – 14 July 1865), born in Limerick, Ireland; was by birth both Irish and by descent English recipient of the Victoria Cross, the highest and most prestigious award for gallantry in the face of the enemy that can be awarded to British and Commonwealth forces.

History and career 
Burslem was born 2 February 1836 in County Limerick, Ireland, the son of George James Burslem of the 94th Regiment of Foot and Susan (née Vokes), of Limerick (married Dublin 15 March 1836). His father was English, and traced his family back to the town of Burslem in Staffordshire. His grandfather was Colonel Nathaniel Godolphin Burslem who was awarded the Gold Medal - the forerunner of the VC Medal. 

On 21 August 1860 at the Taku Forts, China, during the Second China War Lieutenant Burslem, then aged 24 and serving in the 67th Regiment of Foot, British Army, and Private Thomas Lane of his regiment displayed great gallantry for which they were both awarded the VC. They swam the ditches of the North Taku Fort and attempted, during the assault and before an entrance had been effected by anyone, to enlarge an opening in the wall, through which they eventually entered. In doing so, they were both severely wounded.

His Victoria Cross is displayed at The Royal Hampshire Regiment Museum & Memorial Garden, Winchester, England. He later achieved the rank of captain before selling his commission and sailing, along with his brother John Godolphin Burslem, to New Zealand. He arrived in 1865 and bought land in the North Island and was planning to grow flax, but he and an acquaintance capsized their canoe on the Thames River, both drowning on 14 July 1865. His body was not recovered.

References

Listed in order of publication year 
The Register of the Victoria Cross (1981, 1988 and 1997)

Ireland's VCs  (Dept of Economic Development 1995)
Monuments to Courage (David Harvey, 1999)
Irish Winners of the Victoria Cross (Richard Doherty & David Truesdale, 2000)

1837 births
1865 deaths
19th-century Irish people
Irish officers in the British Army
Military personnel from County Limerick
Deaths by drowning in New Zealand
67th Regiment of Foot officers
Irish recipients of the Victoria Cross
British recipients of the Victoria Cross
British Army personnel of the Second Opium War
Accidental deaths in New Zealand
Settlers of New Zealand
British Army recipients of the Victoria Cross